Debye is a lunar impact crater that is located in the northern hemisphere on the Moon's far side, as seen from the Earth. It lies to the south of the crater Chappell, to the southwest of the walled plain Rowland, and to the east of D'Alembert.

The outer rim of this crater has been heavily battered by impacts, and is somewhat distorted from the form of a circle. The northeast rim in particular has become straightened by impact modification, and the crater rim as a whole has a roughly polygonal shape. The southern rim is overlaid by the smaller crater Perkin. The most heavily eroded section of the rim is along the northeast, where a cluster of overlapping craters intrudes into the side. The western rim is notched and indented by several small impacts.

The crater interior is nearly as battered as the outer rim. The outer rampart of Perkin intrudes part way across the southern floor. Parts of remaining interior have been bombarded and churned by impacts, leaving an irregular surface that is nearly as rough as the terrain that surrounds the crater. The most recent of these impacts is a small, cup-shaped crater just to the southwest of the midpoint.

Satellite craters
By convention these features are identified on lunar maps by placing the letter on the side of the crater midpoint that is closest to Debye.

References

External links
 Digital Lunar Orbiter Photo Number V-053-H2

Impact craters on the Moon
Peter Debye